Admiral Kerr may refer to:

John Kerr (Royal Navy officer) (1937–2019), British Royal Navy admiral
Mark Kerr (Royal Navy officer, born 1864) (1864–1944), British Royal Navy admiral
Mark Kerr (Royal Navy officer, born 1949) (born 1949), British Royal Navy rear admiral
Lord Mark Kerr (Royal Navy officer) (1776–1840), British Royal Navy vice admiral
Lord Walter Kerr (1839–1927), British Royal Navy admiral
William Munro Kerr (1876–1959), British Royal Navy vice admiral